Star Healer is a 1985 science fiction book by author James White, part of the Sector General series.

Plot 
Conway is replaced on the ambulance ship Rhabwar by Diagnostician Prilicla. Conway visits healer Khone on the planet Goglesk, and witnesses first-hand their destructive racial mass-hysteria response to physical proximity. He inadvertently links minds with Khone and learns a great deal more. Back at Hospital Station, Conway decides to treat some Hudlar accident victims with a rear-to-front limb transplant, because stranger transplants require permanent exile. Conway also proposes staving off geriatric Hudlar problems by elective amputation. At the end, he successfully delivers a sentient telepathic Unborn (seen in the other  novel of the series Ambulance Ship) from its violent non-sentient Protector.

References

1985 British novels
1985 science fiction novels
Novels by James White (author)
Sector General
Del Rey books